North of Normal is a 2022 Canadian drama film, directed by Carly Stone. Based on the 2014 memoir of the same name by Cea Sunrise Person, the film centres on her unconventional childhood living in the wilderness as the daughter of a hippie mother.

The film's cast includes Sarah Gadon,   Amanda Fix, Robert Carlyle, River Price-Maenpaa, James D’Arcy and Benedict Samuel.

The film was shot in 2021 in Northern Ontario, primarily in and around Sudbury, North Bay and Mattawa.

The film premiered in the Contemporary World Cinema program at the 2022 Toronto International Film Festival on September 11, 2022.

References

External links 
 

2022 films
2022 drama films
Canadian drama films
Films shot in Greater Sudbury
English-language Canadian films
Films shot in North Bay, Ontario
2020s Canadian films